Cocherel is a commune in the Seine-et-Marne department in the Île-de-France region in north-central France.

History
Cocherel and Crépoil (Cocherellium, Crispolium) formed two distinct parishes before 1790 and until 1842 two distinct communes. A royal ordinance of 11 December 1887 united them in a single unit, the chief place of which was fixed at Cocherel.

Geography
Cocherel is at an altitude that reaches 209 meters near the wood of Montjay. It is, after Saint-Georges, of the commune of Verdot, the highest point of the department of Seine-et-Marne; there is no super-permanent watercourse, but only rivers (la Vanche, Méranne, Plants), which roll rain-water and lead them to the Ourcq river.

See also
Communes of the Seine-et-Marne department

References

External links

1999 Land Use, from IAURIF (Institute for Urban Planning and Development of the Paris-Île-de-France région) 

Communes of Seine-et-Marne